Pleistodontes  is a genus of fig wasps native to Australia and New Guinea, with one species (P. claviger) from Java.  Fig wasps have an obligate mutualism with the fig species they pollinate.  Pleistodontes  pollinates species in section Malvanthera of the Ficus subgenus Urostigma.

In their revision of the Australian members of the genus, Carlos Lopez-Vaamonde and coauthors expressed the opinion that P. claviger did not belong in the genus.

Species
The Natural History Museum lists:
 Pleistodontes addicotti Wiebes
 Pleistodontes achorus Lopez-Vaamonde, Dixon & Cook
 Pleistodontes astrabocheilus Lopez-Vaamonde, Dixon & Cook
 Pleistodontes athysanus Lopez-Vaamonde, Dixon & Cook
 Pleistodontes blandus Wiebes
 Pleistodontes claviger (Mayr)
 Pleistodontes cuneatus Wiebes
 Pleistodontes deuterus Lopez-Vaamonde, Dixon & Cook
 Pleistodontes froggatti Mayr
 Pleistodontes galbinus Wiebes
 Pleistodontes greenwoodi (Grandi)
 Pleistodontes immaturus Wiebes
 Pleistodontes imperialis Saunders
 Pleistodontes longicaudus Wiebes
 Pleistodontes macrocainus Lopez-Vaamonde, Dixon & Cook
 Pleistodontes mandibularis Wiebes
 Pleistodontes nigriventris (Girault)
 Pleistodontes nitens (Girault)
 Pleistodontes plebejus Wiebes
 Pleistodontes proximus Wiebes
 Pleistodontes regalis Grandi
 Pleistodontes rennellensis Wiebes
 Pleistodontes rieki Wiebes
 Pleistodontes rigisamos Wiebes
 Pleistodontes schizodontus Lopez-Vaamonde, Dixon & Cook
 Pleistodontes xanthocephalus Lopez-Vaamonde, Dixon & Cook

References

External links 

Agaonidae
Hymenoptera genera
Hymenoptera of Australia
Insects of New Guinea
Insects of Indonesia
Taxa named by Edward Saunders (entomologist)